Salkia is a neighbourhood of Howrah city in Howrah district, West Bengal, India and is administered by the Howrah Municipal Corporation.

Salkia is under the jurisdiction of Golabari Police Station and Malipanchghara Police Station of Howrah City Police.

It is a part of the area covered by Kolkata Metropolitan Development Authority (KMDA). It comes under Howrah Uttar (Vidhan Sabha constituency). It has existed since the 19th century at least. The Postal code of Salkia is 711106.

Location

Salkia is located on the west bank of Hooghly River. Pilkhana is on its south, Liluah and Ghusuri are on its north and Bamangachi is on its west.

Market and recreation
Haragunge Bazaar is a century-old market, located at heart of North Howrah, on Aurobindo Road, Salkia. Aurobindo Road and Dobson Road are commercial streets in Salkia. Jelia Para Lane is one of the posh residential and commercial area of Salkia.

Aurobindo Mall in Salkia (on Aurobindo Road) has a gross leasable area of 1.20 lakh square feet. It was launched in 2017 and has major brands and several restaurants and a three screen multiplex of Miraj Cinemas.

Transport
State Highway 6 (West Bengal)/ Grand Trunk Road passes through the west side of Salkia. Salkia School Road runs along the eastern part of Salkia.

Bus

Private Bus
 24 Bandhaghat – Topsia
 24A Bandhaghat – Topsia
 51 Pardankuni - Howrah Station
 54 Bally Khal – Esplanade
 56 Ruiya Purbapara - Howrah Station
 57A Chanditala - Howrah Station

Mini Bus
 1 Bandhaghat – Esplanade
 1A Satyabala – Ruby Hospital
 2 Salkia – Esplanade
 10 Bally Khal – Khidirpur
 11 Belur Math – Esplanade
 18 Kona – Esplanade
 25 Malipanchghara – Sealdah/Rajabazar
 30 Baluhati – Esplanade
 39 Bhattanagar – Esplanade

CSTC Bus
 S32A Belgharia (Rathtala) - Howrah Station

Bus Routes Without Numbers
 Bandar (Dhanyaghori) – Howrah Station

Train
Howrah Station is the nearest railway station.

Ferry
Salkia has two ferry ghats on the banks of Hooghly River named Golabari Ghat and Bandhaghat Ghat with regular ferry services at 10 min interval.

References 

Cities and towns in Howrah district
Neighbourhoods in Howrah
Neighbourhoods in Kolkata
Kolkata Metropolitan Area
Slums of West Bengal